Order of Merit of Baden-Württemberg is the highest award of the German State of Baden-Württemberg.  Established 26 November 1974, it was originally called the Medal of Merit of Baden-Württemberg (Die Verdienstmedaille des Landes Baden-Württemberg).  Effective 26 June 2009, the medal assumed its current name.  The order is awarded by the Minister-President of Baden-Württemberg for outstanding contributions to the state of Baden-Württemberg, in politics, society, culture and economics. The order is limited to 1,000 living holders, and has been awarded 1,923 times, as of 30 April 2018.

Notable recipients
Helmut Eberspächer (1979)
Artur Fischer (1980)
Ulf Merbold (1983)
Walter Haeussermann (1985)
Anne-Sophie Mutter (1999)
Dorothee Hess-Maier (1999)
Jürgen Klinsmann (2001)
Gerhard Thiele (2001)
Klaus Zehelein (2001)
Wolfgang Ketterle (2002)
Svetlana Geier (2003)
Wolfgang Rihm (2004)
Queen Silvia of Sweden (2007)
Roland Emmerich (2007)
Henry Kissinger (2007)
Stelian Moculescu (2008)
Edmund Stoiber (2009)
Hanna von Hoerner (2009)
Eric Carle (2010)
Jean-Claude Juncker (2010)
Sami Khedira (2016)
Lucia A. Reisch (2017)

References 

Baden-Wurttemberg
Baden-Wurttemberg
Culture of Baden-Württemberg
1974 establishments in Germany